Josée Corbeil (born May 25, 1973 in Dollard-des-Ormeaux, Quebec) is a retired female volleyball player from Canada women's national volleyball team, who competed for her native country at the 1996 Summer Olympics in Atlanta, Georgia. At the age of 23, she was the youngest player of the Canadian Olympic Team.

Prior to playing for the National Team, she received various national awards: 
Canadian champion 1989, MVP. 
Canadian JR champion 1992 and 1993, MVP. 
Canadian collegiate AAA champion 1992, MVP. Recipient of a 125th Anniversary of the Confederation of Canada Medal, 1992. 
Canadian university rookie of the year 1993.

At the age of 17, she participated in the 1991 World Student Games in Sheffield as well as 1993 in  Buffalo and 1997 in Sicily where, as captain, she led the team to a fourth position. She won a bronze medal at the 1995 Pan American Games in Mar del Plata. After her participation at the 1996 Summer Olympics she moved overseas to compete in the professional league of France, Clamart.

She retired from the Canadian National Team in 1998. She is the co-founder and owner of the innovative food concept évoilà5   and is a television commentator for beach and indoor volleyball for the Reseau des Sports (RDS) and Radio-Canada television. She commented the 1999 Pan American Games in Winnipeg, the 2000 Olympic Games in Sydney, the 2004 Olympic Games in Athens, the 2008 Olympic Games in Beijing and the 2012 Olympic Games in London amongst various other international events. Corbeil delivers motivational speeches to students, athletes and business corporations; and is a master of ceremony for various events. She is married and has two daughters.

References
Canadian Olympic Committee

1973 births
Canadian women's volleyball players
French Quebecers
Living people
Olympic volleyball players of Canada
Sportspeople from Quebec
Volleyball players at the 1996 Summer Olympics
People from Dollard-des-Ormeaux
Pan American Games bronze medalists for Canada
Pan American Games medalists in volleyball
Volleyball players at the 1995 Pan American Games
Medalists at the 1995 Pan American Games